Mark Wilson (born 5 June 1984) is a Scottish football player and coach.

Wilson, who played as a right back, started his career at Dundee United. He broke into their first team in the 2002–03 season, and made over 100 league appearances for United before He moved to Celtic in January 2006 for a fee of £500,000. Wilson suffered significant injury problems while with Celtic, which limited his appearances, and he was released at the end of his contract in 2012. He then signed for English Championship club Bristol City before rejoining his first club on a short-term contract in 2013. He left Dundee United in January 2015, signing for Dumbarton the following month.

Wilson represented Scotland at all youth levels and captained the under-21 team. He played once for the Scotland national football team, in 2011.

He retired from playing football in 2015. Wilson was the head coach of Scottish League One club Airdrieonians during most of the 2016–17 season. He was appointed Brechin City manager in September 2019, but was sacked from this position in October 2020.

Early life
Mark Wilson was born in Glasgow on 5 June 1984. He attended St Ambrose High School in Coatbridge.

Club career

Dundee United
Wilson started his career with Dundee United. He joined as a youth player, turned professional in 2000 and made his senior début in January 2002. Signing a new two-year contract just months later, he began the next season as a regular. Wilson scored his first goal in December 2002, a header opening the scoring in a 1–1 home league draw against Hibernian. Five days later, Wilson was announced as the SPL Young Player of the Month for November, saying it was a "great honour to be given this award". Before the end of that season, Wilson signed a new three-year contract, committing himself to the club until the end of the 2005–06 season.

In November 2004, Wilson was wrongly sent off in the derby match against Dundee, being mistakenly penalised for handball when television evidence showed he headed the ball. However, SFA rules dictated that, despite the error, an appeal could not proceed, as such appeals can only proceed on the basis of violent conduct or mistaken identity. The decision not to overturn the dismissal – the first of Wilson's career – drew criticism from journalists, being dubbed a "huge mistake".

Days later, it emerged that Premier League side Everton had approached Dundee United about signing Wilson, although no offer materialised.

Wilson's international exploits were attracting further attention and after being confirmed in April 2005 as one of the nominees for the SPFA Young Player of the Year award, Manchester City were confirmed as planning a move to sign the defender, just one of "several Premier League club" showing an interest. Despite the renewed interest from England, Wilson confirmed he would like to "stay...for the foreseeable future", and signed a new two-year contract in August 2005, extending his stay until the summer of 2008.

Celtic
In early January 2006, it emerged that Wolverhampton Wanderers manager Glenn Hoddle had shown interest in Wilson during the summer and Heart of Midlothian had made an "active enquiry", with Celtic and Leeds United also showing an interest in the player who had a £500,000 release clause inserted in his new contract. By the middle of the month, Celtic were rumoured to be close to completing the signing of Wilson and on 16 January, Wilson signed for the club his family had "supported all their life". Signing for £500,000, Wilson received 25% of the fee under the terms of his contract. He made his debut two weeks later, against Dundee United, playing at right-back in the 3–3 home draw. Wilson suffered a number of injuries in his first full season at Celtic: a broken foot, knee injury and subsequent knee operation. He was also cup-tied for Celtic's victory in the 2006 Scottish League Cup Final.

Wilson became more of a regular in the Celtic side under the management of Neil Lennon. On 1 February 2011, he scored his first goal for Celtic in a 3–0 victory against Aberdeen at Pittodrie Stadium. He got his second goal just 12 days later when he put Celtic 2–0 ahead against his former club Dundee United at Tannadice. On 2 March 2011 during the Scottish Cup fifth round replay against Rangers at Celtic Park, Wilson scored the only goal in an ill-tempered Old Firm fixture with Rangers receiving three red cards.

It was reported on 30 January 2012 that Wilson was in talks with Leeds United over a potential loan for the remainder of the 2011–12 season, but no deal materialised. On 3 May, Wilson captained Celtic in their 1–0 win against St Johnstone. After the game it was revealed that Wilson would be leaving the club at the end of the season so had been given the captaincy for his last match.

Bristol City
Wilson played as a trialist for Bristol City in a pre-season friendly on 30 July 2012. He signed a short-term contract with the club on 16 August.

Wilson was released by Bristol City at the end of the 2012–13 Championship season, along with another defender Matthew Bates.

Return to Dundee United
On 20 August 2013, it was announced by Dundee United that Wilson had rejoined his first senior club, initially on a short-term contract until January 2014. Wilson previously stated he could not rule out returning to the club, stating that Dundee United is "always in my heart".

After six months with the club, Wilson signed an 18-month contract with the club. On 12 April 2014, he started in the Scottish Cup Semi Final at Ibrox. United beat Rangers 3–1 to progress to the Scottish Cup Final.

On 13 January 2015, Dundee United announced that Wilson was leaving the club, with his contract being terminated by mutual consent.

Dumbarton
On 12 February 2015, Wilson signed for Dumbarton on a contract until the end of the 2014–15 season.

He scored his first goal for the club in a 3–1 defeat to Rangers with a volley from the edge of the box. He left the club in June 2015.

International career
Wilson appeared over 30 times for his country in youth internationals up to and including under-21 level. He featured in the 2001 UEFA Under-16 Championship. In February 2004, Wilson won the first of his nineteen caps for the Scotland under-21 side, starting in the 2–1 friendly defeat at home to Hungary under-21. Wilson was named in the Scotland Future squad to face Germany B in December 2004. He started the game, which ended in a 3–0 defeat for Scotland.

Wilson believed that his move to Celtic would enhance his chances of selection for the full national side, but these hopes were denied by a succession of injuries that limited his appearances for Celtic. He was selected by Craig Levein for a friendly game against the Faroe Islands in November 2010, but withdrew due to injury.

Wilson was again named in the Scotland squad in February 2011. Wilson won his first international cap when he replaced Phil Bardsley during the Nations Cup match against Northern Ireland.

Coaching career
After Kevin McBride departed Scottish League One club Airdrieonians, Wilson was then appointed Head coach on 31 October 2016. Wilson was in charge of first-team affairs, working under Director of football, Gordon Dalziel. His 1st game in charge resulted in a 2–1 win at Cliftonhill stadium against Albion Rovers. Airdrie finished third in 2016–17 Scottish League One, but were defeated in the promotion playoffs by Alloa Athletic. Wilson left Airdrie in June 2017, by mutual consent.

On 4 September 2019, Wilson was appointed manager of League Two side Brechin City. Brechin finished last in the curtailed 2019–20 Scottish League Two season, but avoided a relegation playoff as it was cancelled due to the covid-19 pandemic. Wilson was sacked by Brechin after a bad start to the 2020–21 season.

Career statistics

Playing career

Managerial career

Honours
Dundee United
 Scottish Cup runner-up 2005, 2014

Celtic
 Scottish Premier League: 2005–06, 2006–07, 2007–08
 Scottish League Cup: 2009
 Scottish Cup: 2011

Scotland Youth
 Victory Shield: 1998–99

Individual
 SPL Young Player of the Month: November 2002

References

External links
 

1984 births
Living people
Footballers from Glasgow
Scottish footballers
Scottish Premier League players
English Football League players
Scottish Professional Football League players
Dundee United F.C. players
Celtic F.C. players
Bristol City F.C. players
Dumbarton F.C. players
Airdrieonians F.C. managers
Brechin City F.C. managers
Scotland under-21 international footballers
Scotland international footballers
Association football fullbacks
Scottish football managers
Scottish Professional Football League managers